Prospekt Vernadskogo District  is an administrative district (raion) of Western Administrative Okrug, and one of the 125 raions of Moscow, Russia. Population: 62,000 (2017 est.),

History
The district is named for Vladimir Vernadsky, the famed mineralogist and geochemist.  In the 14th century, the area was a forested landholding of the Moscow metropolitans, known for its pine trees and associated shipbuilding.   After a plague in 1655, Belorussians moved into the area.  The population was only 600 at the start of the 20th century, but residential building began in earnest in the 1970s when large avenues and the subway reached the district.  Until 1991, the district was known as Gagarinsky District, after which the current name was adopted.

The Federal Security Service's anti-terrorism and analytical center is located in Prospekt Vernadskogo.

Education
In the district is the main campus of the Moscow State Institute of International Relations (MGIMO), one of the most exclusive institutions of higher education in Russia.  Moscow International Prescool, an international kindergarten, is also situated in Prospekt Vernadskogo district.

See also
Administrative divisions of Moscow

References

Notes

Sources

Districts of Moscow